Xenasma is a genus of corticioid fungi in the order Polyporales. It was circumscribed by mycologist Marinus Anton Donk in 1957.

Species
Xenasma aculeatum C.E.Gómez (1972) – Argentina
Xenasma amylosporum  Parmasto (1968)
Xenasma longicystidiatum  Boidin & Gilles (2000) – Réunion Island
Xenasma parvisporum  Pouzar (1982)
Xenasma praeteritum  (H.S.Jacks.) Donk (1957) – Cameroon; Jamaica; Puerto Rico
Xenasma pruinosum  (Pat.) Donk (1957) – Great Britain
Xenasma pulverulentum  (Litsch.) Donk (1957) – Dominican Republic; France; Great Britain; Jamaica; Netherlands
Xenasma rimicola (P.Karst.) Donk (1957) – Portugal; Taiwan
Xenasma subclematidis  S.S.Rattan (1977) – Asia
Xenasma tulasnelloideum  (Höhn. & Litsch.) Donk (1957) – Cameroon; Dominican Republic; Great Britain; Ontario; Portugal
Xenasma vassilievae Parmasto (1965) – Europe

References

Polyporales
Polyporales genera
Taxa named by Marinus Anton Donk
Taxa described in 1957